Curtin Education Centre, known as Curtin Singapore (a trademark of Curtin University), is a campus of Australia's Curtin University. Curtin Singapore is an Australian-based university that provides local and international students with the opportunity to receive an Australian university education in Singapore. Curtin University is an Australian public research university based in Bentley, Perth, Western Australia. It is named after John Curtin, Prime Minister of Australia from 1941 to 1945, and is the largest university in Western Australia, with 59,939 students in 2021. Curtin campus locations include Perth, Kalgoorlie, Malaysia, Dubai, Mauritius and Singapore. Curtin University is a member of Australian Technology Network (ATN), and Curtin Singapore is registered under the Committee for Private Education Singapore (CPE).

Rankings and reputation 
Curtin University is ranked in the top one per cent of universities worldwide in the Academic Ranking of World Universities 2021. Curtin is also ranked 194th globally in the QS World University Rankings 2022, and received QS 5 Stars Plus in the QS Stars Ratings.

Location 

Curtin Singapore's first campus was located at 90 and 92 Jalan Rajah and was officially opened on 13 November 2008 by S. Iswaran, Singapore's Senior Ministry of Trade and Industry, and Doug Chester, the Australian High Commissioner to Singapore.

In 2022, Curtin Singapore moved onto levels 2 through to 4 of the Alpha building in Singapore Science Park 2. Co-located with industry within the science park precinct, Curtin Singapore is a 15-minute walk from Haw Par Villa MRT station.

History 
Curtin University has been actively present in Singapore since 1986 through the establishment of links with reputable private educational providers in Singapore, namely the Singapore Human Resource Institute, Marketing Institute of Singapore, and the Singapore Institute of Materials Management. Prior to the establishment of its full-fledged independent campus in Singapore, degrees from Curtin were awarded through these partners.

Curtin Singapore's  campus at Jalan Rajah allows the University to be able to provide courses on its own merit. All Curtin University courses are now delivered at the campus commonly known as Curtin Singapore. Students at the Singapore campus are awarded the same degree and transcripts as their peers at the other campuses. The overall investment in this venture is expected to be S$40 million.

Curtin Singapore's operations began in December 2008 with an initial enrolment of 900 students. Curtin Singapore  This included new and continuing students who were enrolled in Curtin's courses through the University's Partners in Singapore. Curtin Singapore now hosts over 1,400 students.

Facilities 
Facilities in the previous location included a student lounge, library, computer labs, mac lab, basketball court and gym are provided to students. Also provided is a canteen and vending machines. 

After Curtin Singapore moved to the Alpha building, facilities are spread over 3 levels of the building. Level 2 includes a library, clinical labs, and gym. The library offers Group Discussion Pods, Individual Pods, Printing Services, Mac computers, charging ports, and study desks. The clinical lab has equipments and tools to simulate hospital and clinic environments. Level 3 includes a student lounge and computer labs. The student lounge has a pantry for students to eat and relax, vending machines, microwaves, pool tables, charging ports, and conference seminar rooms. Level 4 has various group discussion tables and computers for students to access their student portal.

Schools and departments 
The university initially offered courses from the university's School of Business and eventually expanded to include Health Sciences, Humanities, and Science and Engineering.

The courses offered by the Singapore campus follows the identical structure and curriculum content as those offered at the main Bentley campus in Perth. During their course of studies, students have the discretion to transfer to other Curtin campuses in Perth to gain further international exposure and widen their perspectives. Curtin Singapore offers a range of Curtin College pathway programs and Curtin University undergraduate and postgraduate programs:

Entry requirements 
Curtin demands academic entry requirement and English entry requirement for new students including O levels, A levels, IB Diploma, SAT, and Polytechnic diploma or equivalent.

Undergraduate/Bachelor's degree 
For undergraduate courses, Curtin's academic entry requirement is high-school level 12 or equivalent and English entry requirement is minimum 6.0 IELTS score or equivalent.

Graduate/Master's degree 
For postgraduate courses, Curtin academic entry requirement is undergraduate or bachelor's degree acceptable by Curtin standard. To join Curtin postgraduate course, student also required English entry requirement of minimum 6.5 IETLS score or equivalent.

Graduate employment
In a 2019/20 survey conducted by Committee for Private Education on employment outcomes, graduates of Curtin Singapore achieved an overall employment rate of 87.5%.

References

External links

Australia–Singapore relations
Singapore
Private universities in Singapore